Terrill Hanks (born December 7, 1995) is an American football linebacker for the DC Defenders of the XFL. He played college football at New Mexico State.

Early years
Hanks grew up in Miami Gardens, Florida close to Hard Rock Stadium and was a fan of the Miami Dolphins in his childhood. He attended Immaculata-LaSalle High School and played safety for the Royal Lions football team and made over 100 tackles as a senior. Rated a two-star prospect by Rivals.com, but did not qualify academically for an NCAA scholarship until late in his senior year. Hanks committed to play college football at New Mexico State, one of only two schools to offer him a scholarship along with Appalachian State.

College career
Hanks played four seasons for the New Mexico State Aggies. After bulking up and moving from the defensive secondary to linebacker, he started all but one game as a freshman and recorded 81 tackles with 6.5 tackles for loss, four pass deflections, and a forced fumble and was named to the Sun Belt Conference All-Newcomer team. He made 111 total tackles, 15 of which were for a loss, with seven sacks and two forced fumbles as a junior, earning honorable mention All-Sun Belt honors. As a senior, Hanks recorded 101 tackles with 9.0 tackles for loss, three pass deflections, a fumble recovery and a forced fumble in only nine games after missing three contests due to an ankle injury. Over the course of his collegiate career, he accumulated 391 tackles (fourth-most in Aggies history), 43.0 tackles for loss, 11 sacks and 8 interceptions along with 14 passes defensed, three fumble recoveries and seven forced fumbles. After his final season, Hanks earned an invitation to participate in the 2019 Senior Bowl as a member of the South team, where he impressed scouts in practice. In the game Hanks registered eight tackles, tied with Deshaun Davis for most in the game, as the South lost to team North 34-24.

Professional career

Miami Dolphins 
Hanks went unselected in the 2019 NFL Draft, despite being projected as a mid-round pick. Shortly after the draft concluded, he signed with the Miami Dolphins as an undrafted free agent. He was waived on September 1, 2019, and was re-signed to the practice squad. He signed a futures contract with the team on December 31, 2019. Hanks was waived by the Dolphins on April 26, 2020.

Birmingham Stallions 
Hanks was drafted by the Birmingham Stallions in the 30th round of the 2022 USFL Draft. He was transferred to the active roster on April 30, 2022, due to a hamstring injury. He was moved back to the active roster on May 6. He was released on January 2, 2023.

DC Defenders 
On January 1, 2023, Hanks was selected by the DC Defenders in the seventh round of the 2023 XFL Supplemental Draft. He signed with the team on March 8, 2023.

References

External links
New Mexico State Aggies bio

Further reading

1995 births
Living people
Immaculata-LaSalle High School alumni
Players of American football from Miami
American football linebackers
New Mexico State Aggies football players
Miami Dolphins players
Sportspeople from Miami
Birmingham Stallions (2022) players
DC Defenders players